South Korea competed at the 2014 Summer Youth Olympics, in Nanjing, China from 16 August to 28 August 2014.

Archery

South Korea qualified two archers from its performance at the 2013 World Archery Youth Championships.

Individual

Team

Athletics

South Korea qualified six athletes.

Qualification Legend: Q=Final A (medal); qB=Final B (non-medal); qC=Final C (non-medal); qD=Final D (non-medal); qE=Final E (non-medal)

Boys
Track & road events

Girls
Track & road events

Field events

Badminton

South Korea qualified two athletes based on the 2 May 2014 BWF Junior World Rankings.

Singles

Doubles

Boxing

South Korea qualified one boxer based on its performance at the 2014 AIBA Youth World Championships

Boys

Canoeing

South Korea qualified one boat based on its performance at the 2013 World Junior Canoe Sprint and Slalom Championships.

Boys

Fencing

South Korea qualified five athletes based on its performance at the 2014 FIE Cadet World Championships.

Boys

Girls

Mixed Team

Football

South Korea will compete in the boys' tournament.

Boys' tournament

Roster

 Hong Hyun-seok
 Im Wha-rang
 Jeong Woo-yeong
 Joo Hwi-min
 Kim Chan
 Kim Gyu-hyeong
 Kim Kyu-nam
 Kim Min-gyu
 Kim Seong-jun
 Kim Seung-ha
 Lee Chang-min
 Lee Ji-yong
 Lee Kyu-hyuk
 Lee Sang-su
 Lim Jae-hyuk
 Park Jun-phil
 Park Kyeong-woo
 Shin Do-hyun

Group Stage

Semi-final

Gold medal match

Golf

South Korea qualified one team of two athletes based on the 8 June 2014 IGF Combined World Amateur Golf Rankings.

Individual

Team

Gymnastics

Artistic Gymnastics

South Korea qualified two athletes based on its performance at the 2014 Asian Artistic Gymnastics Championships.

Boys

Girls

Handball

South Korea qualified a girls' team based on its performance at the 2013 Asian Youth Games.

Girls' tournament

Roster

 Choi Ji-hyeon
 Gim Bo-eun
 Hur You-jin
 Kang Da-hye
 Kang Eun-hye
 Kang Kyung-min
 Kim Seong-eun
 Kim So-ra
 Lee Ga-hee
 Lee Ha-neul
 Park Jo-eun
 Park Jun-hee
 Park Min-jeong
 Yu So-jeong

Group stage

Semifinals

Gold medal game

Judo

South Korea qualified two athletes based on its performance at the 2013 Cadet World Judo Championships.

Individual

Team

Modern Pentathlon

South Korea qualified two athletes based on its performance at the Asian and Oceania YOG Qualifiers.

Shooting

South Korea qualified two shooters based on its performance at the 2014 Asian Shooting Championships.

Individual

Team

Swimming

South Korea qualified four swimmers.

Boys

Girls

Mixed

Table Tennis

South Korea qualified a male athlete based on the ITTF Under-18 World Rankings. Later South Korea qualified a female athlete based on its performance at the Road to Nanjing series.

Singles

Team

Qualification Legend: Q=Main Bracket (medal); qB=Consolation Bracket (non-medal)

Taekwondo

South Korea qualified one athlete based on its performance at the Taekwondo Qualification Tournament.

Boys

Tennis

South Korea qualified three athletes based on the 9 June 2014 ITF World Junior Rankings.

Singles

Doubles

Triathlon

South Korea qualified two athletes based on its performance at the 2014 Asian Youth Olympic Games Qualifier.

Individual

Relay

Weightlifting

South Korea qualified 1 quota in the boys' events based on the team ranking after the 2014 Weightlifting Youth & Junior Asian Championships.

Boys

Wrestling

South Korea qualified one athlete based on its performance at the 2014 Asian Cadet Championships.

Girls

References
http://www.londonukseo.com/

2014 in South Korean sport
Nations at the 2014 Summer Youth Olympics
South Korea at the Youth Olympics